Ishtiyak Khan (born Istayak Arif Khan; 15 April 1976) is an Indian actor known for his work in bollywood movies and television shows. He came into limelight for his role as english teacher in the film Phas Gaye Re Obama which also went viral as a meme in social media and he gained popularity from his role as Rajesh Autowala in Tamasha, Ludo (as Inspector), Janhit Mein Jaari (as Purushottam), Anaarkali of Aarah, as well as portraying Chaurasia in Bharat, Vasu (Lawyer from Rohtak) in Jolly LLB, Sunny in FryDay, and Munna in Ammaa Ki Boli. He is also well known for his role in Television series as Kappu Ka Sasur in the fourth season of The Kapil Sharma Show (2022), Puttan in Har Shaakh Pe Ullu Baithaa Hai, and in web series Dhindora (as Boss).

Early life  
Khan was born in Panna, Madhya Pradesh. He completed primary education there. In an interview, Khan stated that In 1989, he joined a theatre group named "Bharatiya Jan Natya Sangh (IPTA)". He did street play Gili Gili Fu directed by IPTA, Sri Devesh Mishra.  After that, his first stage show was Ek Tha Gadha Urff Aladdad Kha, directed by Satish Sharma. He studied Rang Sangeet from Shri Baba Karant. He was selected for the National School of drama in 2004. Now he is the king of comedy.

Filmography

Television

Ad Films 
 Lux Venus with Amitabh Bacchan
 Udaan App with Pankaj Tripathi
 IPL promo

References

External links 
 
 

Indian male film actors
Male actors in Hindi cinema
Living people
Male actors from Uttar Pradesh
People from Madhya Pradesh
21st-century Indian male actors
1976 births